Locust Creek Township is a township in Linn County, in the U.S. state of Missouri.

Locust Creek Township was named after the creek of the same name within its borders.

References

Townships in Missouri
Townships in Linn County, Missouri